Albert Berger is an American film producer.

Biography
He attended Tufts University and the MFA program in film at the Columbia University School of the Arts. He is an executive producer of the HBO series The Leftovers. He and Ron Yerxa are founders of Bona Fide Productions. They were nominated for an Academy Award for Best Picture for Nebraska.

References

External links

Living people
American film producers
Place of birth missing (living people)
Year of birth missing (living people)
Columbia University School of the Arts alumni
Tufts University alumni